Anton Moedardo Moeliono (21 February 1929 in Bandung – 25 July 2011 in Jakarta) was an Indonesian  linguist. He is notable for his contribution into codification of the Indonesian language and orthography, and also in the field of Indonesian terminology.

In 1958, he completed his undergraduate studies at the Faculty of Literature of the University of Indonesia. In 1965, he obtained his master's degree in general linguistics at Cornell University. In 1971, he undertook postgraduate studies at the University of Leiden. He obtained his doctorate in 1981 at the University of Indonesia. Since 1982, he was a professor there.

Selected bibliography
 Fonologi Bahasa Nias Utara (1958)
 On Grammatical Categories in Indonesian (1964)
 Edjaan Baru Bahasa Indonesia (1967)
 Bahasa Indonesia dan Pembakuannya: Suatu Tinjauan Linguistik (1969)
 Ciri-Ciri Bahasa Indonesia yang Baku (1976)
 Santun Bahasa (1984)
 Peranan Bahasa Pembangunan (1988)
 Pedoman Pengembangan Istilah (1988)

References

2011 deaths
Linguists from Indonesia
University of Indonesia alumni
People from Bandung
1929 births
Cornell University alumni